The Baltimore Examiner was a free daily newspaper in Baltimore, Maryland,  launched in 2006, ceased publication in 2009.

History
The Baltimore Examiner was launched in 2006 by the Philip Anschutz-owned Clarity Media Group as part of a national chain that at the time included The San Francisco Examiner and The Washington Examiner.  In contrast to the paid subscription Baltimore Sun, the Examiner was a free newspaper funded solely by advertisements. After being unable to find a buyer, Baltimore Examiner closed after its final publication on February 15, 2009.

The managing editor of The Baltimore Examiner, along with several others from various national newspapers, started The Baltimore Post-Examiner in 2012.

The Examiner's sign adorned the facade of its former headquarters until 2013, when it was replaced with that of technology marketing firm R2integrated. The naming rights were later acquired by the law firm Silverman, Thompson, Slutkin & White.

Conservative tone
Editorially, The Examiner was often viewed as taking a more conservative tone than The Baltimore Sun.

References

External links
 The Baltimore Examiner (Digital Edition Archives), January 1, 2008 – February 15, 2009.
 Sullivan, Erin. "Final Examiner," Baltimore City Paper, January 29, 2009.
 Frank Keegan 

Defunct newspapers published in Maryland
Newspapers published in Baltimore
Free daily newspapers
Newspapers established in 2005
Publications disestablished in 2009
2005 establishments in Maryland
2009 disestablishments in Maryland
Anschutz Corporation
Defunct free daily newspapers